Welkin may refer to:

 Welkin (rocket engine), developed by Galactic Energy
 Welkin Capital Management
 Welkin Gunther, the protagonist in Valkyria Chronicles
 Westland Welkin, a British World War 2 high-altitude fighter aircraft

See also